Sad or High Kicking is a folk album by Martin Simpson recorded and released in 1985.

Produced at Ideal Sound Recorders, London by Tony Engle and Martin Simpson. Originally issued by Topic Records in the UK, catalogue number 12TS438.

Like most Martin Simpson albums, it includes a mixture of contemporary and traditional pieces.

Track listing
"Jazzman" (Holstein)
"Shawnee Town" (Dillon Bustin)
"Moth" (Anne Lister)
"Living Without You" (Randy Newman)
"For Jessica, Sad or High Kicking" (Simpson)/ "My Dearest Dear" (Traditional; arranged Simpson)
"Icarus" (Anne Lister)
"No Depression in Heaven" (Traditional; arranged Simpson)
"Let It Be Me" (Gilbert Bécaud, Mann Curtis, Pierre Delanoë)
"Stillness in Company" (Jessica Radcliffe)
"The Lakes of Ponchartrain" (Traditional; arranged Simpson)

Personnel
Martin Simpson - vocals, acoustic and electric guitar, lap steel, dobro
Micky Barker - drums, percussion
Johnathan Davie - electric bass guitars
Laurie Harper - fiddle, mandoline
Rob Mason - harmonica 
with
Dave Clewlow - trumpets, flugelhorn
Ian Blake - Clarinets
Andrew Cronshaw - Zither, stellpans

References

1985 albums
Martin Simpson albums